Mitzi Møller (born 2 October 1979) is a Danish retired defender who played for Hillerød G&IF and the Danish national team.

International career

Møller was also part of the Danish team at the 2001 European Championships.

References

External links

1979 births
Danish women's footballers
Denmark women's international footballers
Women's association football defenders
Living people